Carnarvon Road is a street in Tsim Sha Tsui, Kowloon, Hong Kong. It forms the shape of an uppercase "J", linking Kimberley Road (near Knutsford Terrace) and Nathan Road.

Name
The street is named after Henry Herbert, 4th Earl of Carnarvon, Secretary of State for the Colonies from 1866 to 1867 and from 1874 to 1978. The town and county in Wales to which the title of Earl of Carnarvon refers are historically spelled Caernarfon, having been Anglicised to Carnarvon or Caernarvon.

Shopping

The area east of Nathan Road, comprising Cameron Road, Granville Road and Carnarvon Road has been described as having "teeming shops" and likely the main reason that Hong Kong acquired the "shopping paradise" tag, a phrase first put into print in an ironic manner by author Han Suyin, in her 1952 novel A Many-Splendoured Thing.

Roads nearby

 Granville Road
 Hanoi Road
 Kimberley Street
 Kimberley Road
Hau Fook Street
 Cameron Road
 Hart Avenue
Humphrey's Avenue
Bristol Avenue

Nearby 
 East Tsim Sha Tsui station
 Tung Ying Building

References

External links 

 Some buildings on the road

Roads in Kowloon
Tsim Sha Tsui